Nikola Stevanović (born 21 May 1987, in Belgrade) is a Serbian professional boxer and a former IBF Intercontinental light middleweight champion.

Professional career 

Stevanovic started boxing at age 11. He trained at a boxing club Cukaricki, and then in a boxing club Partizan with his brother Stefan.

He made his professional debut as a 17-year-old on October 5, 2004. in Belgrade.          He defeated Catalin Andrei Tilimpe via a first-round knockout.
With 20 years Stevanovic defeat Belgian Cedric Charlier and became the IBF World Junior Champion.  He successfully defended Title against Georgia's Alexander Benidze.  In June 2009. he won the vacant IBF International Title after defeating Francesco di Fiore, and in October 2009. won the Intercontinental IBF Title beating Tshepo Mashego .
On January 24, 2009, Stevanovic lost the fight to Alexander Abraham  for the EBU-EE (European External European Union) Light Middleweight Title at the Erdgas Arena,  Germany.

Nikola Stevanovic has been honoured for Fight of the Year three times: in 2009. against Tshepo Mashego,  for fight in 2011. against Stefano Castellucci  and for fight in 2012. against Ayoub Nefzi.
He received the award for the best Serbian boxer in the period from 2004. to 2014.

Professional boxing record 

| style="text-align:center;" colspan="8"|23 Wins (8 Knockouts), 1 Loss, 1 Draws
|-  style="text-align:center; background:#e3e3e3;"
|  style="border-style:none none solid solid; "|Res.
|  style="border-style:none none solid solid; "|Record
|  style="border-style:none none solid solid; "|Opponent
|  style="border-style:none none solid solid; "|Type
|  style="border-style:none none solid solid; "|Rd., Time
|  style="border-style:none none solid solid; "|Date
|  style="border-style:none none solid solid; "|Location
|  style="border-style:none none solid solid; "|Notes
|- align=center
|Win||23–1-1||align=left| Ayoub Nefzi
|||||
|align=left|
|align=left|
|- align=center
|Win||22–1-1||align=left| Stefano Castellucci
|||||
|align=left|
|align=left|
|- align=center
|Win||21–1-1||align=left|Chris van Heerden
|||||
|align=left|
|align=left|
|- align=center
|Win||20–1-1||align=left| Marjan Markovic
|||||
|align=left|
|- align=center
|Win||19–1-1||align=left| Tshepo Mashego
|||||
|align=left|
|align=left|
|- align=center
|Win||18–1-1||align=left| Francesco Di Fiore
|||||
|align=left|
|align=left|
|- align=center
|Win||17–1-1||align=left| Mariusz Biskupski
|||||
|align=left|
|- align=center
|Loss||17-1–0||align=left| Alexander Abraham
|||||
|align=left|
|align=left|
|- align=center
|Win||16-1–0||align=left| Nikola Matic
|||||
|align=left|
|- align=center
|Win||15–1-0||align=left| Joseph Sovijus
|||||
|align=left|
|- align=center
|Win||14-1–0||align=left| Alexander Benidze
|||||
|align=left|
|align=left|
|- align=center
|Win||13-1–0||align=left| Thomas Hengstberger
|||||
|align=left|
|- align=center
|Win||12-1–0||align=left| Cedric Charlier
|||||
|align=left|
|align=left|
|- align=center
|style="background:#abcdef;"|Draw||12-0||align=left| Salvatore Annunziata
|||||
|align=left|
|align=left|
|- align=center
|Win||11-0||align=left| Slavomir Merva
|||||
|align=left|
|- align=center
|Win||10–0||align=left| Rumen Kostov
|||||
|align=left|
|- align=center
|Win||9–0||align=left| Joseph Sovijus
|||||
|align=left|
|- align=center
|Win||8–0||align=left| Patrik Prokopecz
|||||
|align=left|
|- align=center
|Win||7–0||align=left| Hamid Semic
|||||
|align=left|
|- align=center
|Win||6–0||align=left| Igor Krbusik
|||||
|align=left|
|- align=center
|Win||5–0||align=left| Petr Rykala
|||||
|align=left|
|- align=center
|Win||4–0||align=left| Jozef Kubovsky
|||||
|align=left|
|- align=center
|Win||3–0||align=left| Krasimir Dimitrov
|||||
|align=left|
|- align=center
|Win||2–0||align=left| Stefan Dimitrov
|||||
|align=left|
|- align=center
|Win||1–0||align=left| Catalin Tilimpea
|||||
|align=left|
|align=left|

 
|-

|-

|-

References

External links 
 

1987 births
Light-middleweight boxers
Living people
Serbian male boxers